Alex Ferrari may refer to:

Alex Ferrari (singer)
Alex Ferrari (director)
Alex Ferrari (footballer)